Tatyana Ivanovna Shikolenko (born 10 May 1968 in Krasnodar) is a retired Russian track and field athlete who competed in the javelin throw. During her career, she won two silver medals at the World Championships. Her personal best throw of 67.20 metres was achieved in 2000. She battled primarily with Mirela Manjani, who captured the gold medal on both occasions Shikolenko finished second.

After the dissolution of the Soviet Union, Tatyana Shikolenko represented Belarus for a while until switching nationality to her birth country Russia in 1996. Her sister Natalya also achieved distinction in javelin throwing; she however remained a Belarusian citizen.

International competitions

See also
List of nationality transfers in athletics
List of World Athletics Championships medalists (women)
List of Belarus-related topics

References

1968 births
Living people
Sportspeople from Krasnodar
Soviet female javelin throwers
Belarusian female javelin throwers
Russian female javelin throwers
Olympic female javelin throwers
Olympic athletes of Russia
Athletes (track and field) at the 2000 Summer Olympics
Universiade gold medalists in athletics (track and field)
Universiade gold medalists for the Soviet Union
Medalists at the 1991 Summer Universiade
Goodwill Games medalists in athletics
Competitors at the 1990 Goodwill Games
World Athletics Championships athletes for Belarus
World Athletics Championships athletes for Russia
World Athletics Championships medalists
European Athletics Championships medalists
Russian Athletics Championships winners
IAAF World Athletics Final winners